Albert Alexander "Gunga" Sparlis (May 20, 1920 – July 9, 2005) is a former professional American football guard who played for the Green Bay Packers of the National Football League. He played college football at UCLA and was an all-American. He was inducted into the College Football Hall of Fame in 1983.

References 

1920 births
2005 deaths
American football offensive linemen
UCLA Bruins football players
Green Bay Packers players
College Football Hall of Fame inductees
People from Porterville, California
Players of American football from Los Angeles